Preston Ridd (born 28 October 1953 from Christchurch) is a former New Zealand professional darts player. He won the New Zealand Open three times and the New Zealand Masters once.

Career
He qualified for the 2011 PDC World Darts Championship as the New Zealand champion. He whitewashed Northern Ireland's Michael Mansell 4–0 in the preliminary round, but won only one leg in losing to Vincent van der Voort 3–0 in the first round.

Ridd represented New Zealand with Warren French in the 2012 PDC World Cup of Darts and  together they were beaten 5–3 by Austria in the first round who will be Mensur Suljović & Dietmar Burger.

Personal life
Ridd, whose parents originated from Devon, holds a British passport.

World Championship results

PDC
 2011: First round (lost to Vincent van der Voort 0–3) (sets)

References

External links

1953 births
Living people
New Zealand darts players
New Zealand people of English descent
Professional Darts Corporation associate players
PDC World Cup of Darts team New Zealand 
Sportspeople from Christchurch